Puerto Rico Highway 137 (PR-137) is a north–south road that travels from Vega Baja to Morovis.

Morovis National Cemetery
Morovis National Cemetery for veterans was established in Morovis in 2020, at a 247.5-acre parcel of land that can be accessed from Highway 137 at km 11.2. It was built to take over the functions of the existing Puerto Rico National Cemetery located in Bayamón.

Major intersections

See also

 List of highways numbered 137

References

External links
 

137